Auto Trader Group plc, commonly known as Auto Trader, is a British automotive online marketplace and classified advertising business. It enables the buying and selling of new and vehicles by private sellers and trade retailers. Auto Trader is listed on the London Stock Exchange trading under the ticker symbol AUTO, and is a constituent of the FTSE 100 Index.

History

Early history: twentieth century
Auto Trader was founded in 1975 by English businessman and car aficionado John Madejski.

Whilst on holiday in Florida, Madejski had seen a car sales magazine that included pictures of the vehicles on sale. Realising the potential of the idea, together with his business partners Paul Gibbons and Peter Taylor he founded Thames Valley Trader in 1977.

Initially, the magazine advertised anything and everything, from houses to cars and even aircraft, but it soon narrowed its focus to vehicles and was rebranded Auto Trader in 1988. The first title was followed by the publication of a second one, Southern Auto Trader.

The company launched a website, Autotrader.co.uk, in 1996, giving people the ability to buy or sell a car online. Consumers could search for cars and other vehicles using their postcode. Autotrader.co.uk quickly became the most popular automotive website in the United Kingdom, by 2009 attracting 10.3 million unique users per month, on average.

British international investment firm BC Partners bought a stake in the business from John Madejski in July 1998 for £260m; then Guardian Media Group, who had acquired Automart in 1982, merged that business with Hurst Publishing in May 2000 so creating Trader Media.

21st century and evolution to digital only
Auto Trader launched a mobile website in 2002, initially using the WAP protocol.

In July 2008, Auto Trader launched a .mobi site, and in July 2009, separate versions for differing handset capability levels were released.

Auto Trader developed its mobile offering further from March 2010, releasing applications enabling users to search for vehicles on iOS, Android and Windows Mobile devices using augmented reality features.

In April 2011 a group called the Motor Traders Advertising Union launched an online petition and proposed a mass pull out by auto dealers who objected to an increase in the fee for a dealership to advertise a car, from £7 to £8.50, before any discounts for bulk advertisers.

Sales of the print magazine dwindled in line with the decline of the print industry. By July 2012, circulation had dropped to an average of 87,000 copies a week and down to 27,000 in March 2013.

In June 2013, after thirty six years, the final editions of the printed magazine were published, with the company concentrating on its online business.

In October 2013, AutoTrader.co.za (Auto Trader South Africa) a subsidiary of the Auto Trader Group, was sold off to become an independent South African company.

In January 2014, Apax Partners bought the business from Guardian Media Group for £600m.

In March 2014, the company rebranded, and became known as Auto Trader, and in March 2015, Auto Trader Group launched an initial public offering, with a market capitalisation of about £2bn and floated on the London Stock Exchange on the FTSE250.

In 2020 it was reported that Auto Trader had created a data lake and intelligence platform using services including Amazon Web Services and Google's Looker, and was working to foster a ‘culture of data’ internally by setting up a data academy for employees.

Auto Trader launched a product called Retailer Stores in April 2021, which offers retailers their own customisable destination within the marketplace, and a product called Instant Cash Offer in August 2021, which provides consumers with an alternative to selling privately, with a ‘no-haggle’ cash price for their vehicle, free collection from their home, with no administration fees and immediate payment as soon as the offer is accepted.

Auto Trader granted four months of free advertising to its retailer customers to support them during the COVID-19 pandemic.

In 2022, Auto Trader began a partnership with the Office for National Statistics sharing its used car pricing data to power its official measures of inflation, including the Consumer Prices Index.

Also in 2022, Auto Trader acquired Autorama, owner of Vanarama, one of the UK’s largest transactional marketplaces for leasing new vehicles.

Acquisitions

Marketplace and products

Online marketplace
At the core of Auto Trader is its online marketplace, where consumers buy and sell cars and other vehicles, and where car dealerships advertise and sell their stock, both new and used, to consumers. Retailers pay to advertise vehicles, and consumers also pay a fee unless the transaction is less than GPB 1,000.

AutoTrader.co.uk website
The Auto Trader website was ranked first in the UK in the vehicles category by Similarweb and tenth globally in January 2022.

Mobile app
As of February 2022, Auto Trader's mobile app had ratings of 4.8/5 on the Apple App Store and 4.2/5 on Google Play.

YouTube channel
Auto Trader operates a YouTube channel where it publishes videos such as car reviews, car comparisons, drag races, and buying guides. Television presenter and automotive journalist Rory Reid joined Auto Trader as YouTube Director in December 2019, and fronts the videos on the channel.

As of February 2023, the channel had 838k subscribers and had an accumulated 233,133,504 video views.

Diversity, inclusion and social good
Auto Trader are one of only three FTSE100 companies to have 50:50 gender parity on their Board, and were ranked UK’s 7th Inclusive Top 50 Employer 2020/21.
The company makes regular contributions to Ben, a charity which provides support to the people of the UK's automotive industry.

Focus on sustainable mobility
Auto Trader has a dedicated electric vehicle hub and in 2021 began giving away an EV to consumers every month.
Auto Trader regularly shares its data and insight with the UK Government helping to shape the policies required to further the mass adoption of electric vehicles.
At COP26 in 2021, Auto Trader launched the first Automotive Carbon Literacy Toolkit, which was funded and developed in partnership with the Carbon Literacy Trust, and designed with leading retailers and manufacturers.

The business also has a wider environmental strategy that includes a net zero carbon emissions goal and several other initiatives.

References

External links 
 

Mass media companies established in 1975
British companies established in 1975
Automotive websites
Automotive companies of the United Kingdom
Online marketplaces of the United Kingdom
Online automotive companies
Used car market
Automobile magazines published in the United Kingdom
Online magazines published in the United Kingdom
Defunct magazines published in the United Kingdom
Magazines established in 1975
Magazines disestablished in 2013
Mass media companies of England
Online magazines with defunct print editions
Companies listed on the London Stock Exchange